The 2013 Morocco Tennis Tour – Kenitra was a professional tennis tournament played on clay courts. It was the 1st edition of the tournament which was part of the 2013 ATP Challenger Tour. It took place in Kenitra, Morocco between 16 and 22 September.

Singles main-draw entrants

Seeds

 1 Rankings are as of September 9, 2013.

Other entrants
The following players received wildcards into the singles main draw:
  Yassine Idmbarek
  Mehdi Jdi 
  Hicham Khaddari
  Younès Rachidi

The following players used Protected Entry to gain entry into the main draw:
  Laurent Rochette

The following players received entry from the qualifying draw:
  Kimmer Coppejans
  Roberto Marcora
  Alexander Rumyantsev
  Alexander Ward

The following players received into the singles main draw as a lucky loser:
  Alexis Musialek

Champions

Singles

 Dominic Thiem def.  Teymuraz Gabashvili 7–6(7–4), 5–1 ret.

Doubles

 Gerard Granollers /  Jordi Samper-Montana def.  Taro Daniel /  Alexander Rumyantsev 6–4, 6–4

External links
 Official website

Kenitra
Morocco Tennis Tour – Kenitra